Kil or KIL may refer to:

Kil Municipality, Värmland County, Sweden
Kil, Värmland, Kil Municipality, Sweden
Kil, Nacka Municipality, Sweden
Kil Hundred, former hundred, Värmland, Sweden
Kil, Telemark, Kragerø, Norway
Dordtsche Kil, a river in the Netherlands
KIL (film), 2014, Malaysia

KIL may refer to:

 Kildonan railway station, Scotland, National Rail code 
 Kongsvinger IL, a sports club in  Norway
 KIL Toppfotball, Kongsvinger, Norway
 Russian rescue ship KIL-168

See also 
 Kiel (disambiguation)
 Kyl (disambiguation)